A Gentleman from Mississippi is a 1908 comedic play by Harrison Rhodes and Thomas A. Wise. It was popular when released, debuting on Broadway on September 28, 1908, and playing for 407 performances at the Bijou Theatre, and on the roof garden of the New Amsterdam Theatre during the summer of 1909. Douglas Fairbanks played the leading role of Bud Haines.

Receiving positive reviews from the critics, it was produced by William A. Brady and Joseph R. Grismer, and was one of the "major hits of its day." U.S. President Theodore Roosevelt saw the play shortly before its Broadway debut at a Washington warm-up performance at the National Theatre, and proclaimed it a "perfectly corking play. Bully! A ripper!" Roosevelt's successor, William Howard Taft, also later saw and approved of the play, and was featured in some of the play's advertising.

It was adapted into a novel based on the play's success, and the play traveled widely after closing on Broadway, where actor Burr McIntosh returned from the stage after a long break to take over for Wise.

The play was also made into a silent film in 1914, where Wise reprised his role, and a young Evelyn Brent was also in the cast. A plan to make another film based on the play in 1936 was never completed.

Harrison and Rhodes also collaborated on a second play, An Old New Yorker (1911).

Plot

The play's setting is Washington, D.C., where corrupt Senators are attempting to profit off a planned naval base in Mississippi. William Langdon (played by Wise), the junior senator from Mississippi, decides to fight the scheme, assisted by his private secretary Bud Haines (played by Fairbanks).

Original Broadway cast
 Thomas A. Wise as William A. Langdon 
 W.J. Brady as Horatio Peabody
 Hal De Forrest as James Stevens
 Ernest Baxter as Chares Norton
 Stanhope Wheatcroft as Randolph Langdon
 Douglas Fairbanks as "Bud" Haines
 Harry Stubbs as Dick Cullen
 Frederick Bock as Colonel Beverly Stoneman 
 E.H. Bender as Clerk at International Hotel 
 Charles Chappelle as Colonel J.D. Telfer
 M.W. Rale as Signore Caracioli
 Donald Mackintire as a Bridegroom
 Henry Gibson as a Porter
 Charles Johnson as a Bellboy
 Harriet Worthington as Carolina Langdon
 Lola May as Hope Georgia Langdon 
 Agnes De Lane as Amelia Butterworth
 Karen Nielsen as Mme. Des Aretins
 Sallie Livingston as a Bride

References

External links

 
October 1909 playbill from Park Theatre in Boston

1908 plays
Plays set in Washington, D.C.
1914 films
American films based on plays
American plays adapted into films
Broadway plays
American black-and-white films
American silent feature films
1910s American films